Bangladesh–Japan relations were established on 10 February 1972. By 2015, the bilateral annual trade of these two countries was US$2.3 billion.

Bangladesh and Japan have historically been strong bonded nations. The relationship between Bengali and Japanese people is centuries old.

In a BBC World Poll, 71% of Bangladesh had a favorable view of Japan, making Bangladesh one of the most pro-Japanese countries in the world.

Historical background 
The relation between Bangladesh and Japan which was in trouble during the British period and Partition of Bengal 1947 got regular in mid-1950 when the Consular Mission of Japan (CMJ) in Dhaka started to make contact with people-to-people.

Embassies
On 11 February 1972, Bangladesh opened an embassy in Tokyo, and Japan opened an embassy in Bangladesh. The Embassy of Japan in Bangladesh is located at 5 & 7, Dutabash Road, Baridhara, Dhaka, where it has been located since the early 1990s.

Trade and investment

Japan is Bangladesh's 7th-largest export market ; imports from Bangladesh make up 0.17% of all Japanese imports. Common imports from Bangladesh to Japan include textiles, leather goods, and shrimp. By 2004, Japan had become Bangladesh's fourth-largest source of foreign direct investment, behind the United States, United Kingdom, and Malaysia. Japan is also a significant source of development aid to Bangladesh.

Japan's political goals in its relationship with Bangladesh include gaining support for their bid to join the United Nations Security Council, and securing markets for their finished goods.

In 2022, there were about 17,394 Bangladeshis in Japan. Japan recognized the People's Republic of Bangladesh on 10 February 1972, soon after its independence. Both parties celebrated thirty years of relations in 2002.

References

Further reading

External links

 Embassy of Bangladesh in Japan
 Embassy of Japan in Bangladesh

 
Japan
Bilateral relations of Japan